This is a list of all tornadoes that were confirmed by local offices of the National Weather Service in the United States from January to March 2011.

United States yearly total

January

January 1 event

January 9 event

January 17 event

January 25 event

February

February 1 event

February 11 event

February 24 event

February 25 event

February 27 event

February 28 event

March

March 5 event

March 6 event

March 8 event

March 9 event

March 10 event

March 14 event

March 16 event

March 18 event

March 19 event

March 21 event

March 22 event

March 23 event

March 26 event

March 29 event

March 30 event

March 31 event

See also 
 Tornadoes of 2011

Notes

References 

United States,01
Tornadoes,01
2011,01
Tornadoes
Tornadoes
Tornadoes